The Chase Chiefs were a junior 'B' ice hockey team from Chase, British Columbia. They played in the Kootenay International Junior Hockey League. They were founded in 2007 as an expansion team. In 2010, the team moved to Kelowna, to become the Kelowna Chiefs. In 2011 the town of Chase received a second expansion franchise in the KIJHL, the Chase Heat, replacing the Chiefs

Season-by-season record

Note: GP = Games played, W = Wins, L = Losses, T = Ties, OTL = Overtime Losses, Pts = Points, GF = Goals for, GA = Goals against

Playoffs

References 

Ice hockey teams in British Columbia
2007 establishments in British Columbia
2010 disestablishments in British Columbia
Ice hockey clubs established in 2007
Sports clubs disestablished in 2010